Estadio Ceibeño is a multi-purpose stadium in La Ceiba, Honduras.

Overview
It is currently used mostly for football matches and is the home stadium of Honduran National league side Victoria and Vida as well as for second tier Atlántida.Honduras national football team has used Estadio Ceibeño as its home stadium.  The stadium holds 18,000 people.

It has been used for music concerts on occasion.

References

Nilmo
Multi-purpose stadiums in Honduras
La Ceiba
C.D. Victoria